The San Martín Territory was a national territory of the Republic of New Granada (1846-1856) and the United States of Colombia (1866-1886) created on June 2, 1846. The capital was San Martín.

In the South it bordered the Caquetá Territory.

Timeline 
 1832 part of Bogotá Province as San Martín Territory.
 1844 part of Cundinamarca State as San Martín Territory.
 1856 part of Bogotá Province as the San Martín Canton.
 1863 part of Cundinamarca State as San Martín Territory.
 1867 Cundinamarca cedes all rights over the territory to the Union
 1875 it is named Meta Province
 1886 as Oriente Province part of Cundinamarca Department
 1906 Meta National Territory
 1909 Meta National Intendency
 1959 Meta Department

References

See also 
 Meta Department
 Meta Province
 San Martín de los Llanos

Former subdivisions of Colombia
1832 establishments in the Republic of New Granada